Pseudohemihyalea splendens is a moth in the family Erebidae. It was described by William Barnes and James Halliday McDunnough in 1910. It is found from south-eastern Arizona in the US  to Mexico.

The length of the forewings is 26–28 mm. Adults are on wing from late July to mid-November.

References

Moths described in 1910
splendens